My Heart to Joy was an American emo band from Berlin, Connecticut. Originally formed when the members are at high school, They released a demo, two EPs, a compilation, and an album. 

Members of My Heart to Joy went on to play in The World Is a Beautiful Place & I Am No Longer Afraid to Die and Self Defense Family, and previously The Golden Gates, Summit, Connecticut, and Perfect Lines.

Members 
 Alan Huck - Drums (2006-2011)
 Ryan Nelson - Guitar, Vocals (2006-2011)
 Jon Makowski - Bass (2006-2009)
 Greg Horbal - Guitar, Vocals (2007-2011)
 Chris Teti - Bass (2009-2010), Guitar (2010-2011)
 Ross Cohen - Bass (2010-2011)
 Steven K Buttery - Drums (2010-2011)

Discography

Demo albums 
 Demo Days (2006)

Extended plays 
 Heavenly Bodies (2007)
 Virgin Sails (2008)
 Reasons To Be (2011)

Albums 
 Seasons In Verse (2009)

Compilations 
 1990-1999 (2009)
 Excellent Library (Unreleased)

Reviews 
 AbsolutePunk: My Heart to Joy - Reasons to Be EP
 PunkNews: My Heart to Joy - Virgin Sails
 PunkNews: My Heart to Joy - Seasons In Verse

External links 
 Discogs Profile
 Facebook Profile
 Bandcamp Profile
 Topshelf Records Profile

Rock music groups from Connecticut
Topshelf Records artists
American emo musical groups